Ulrich ”Ueli” Steiger (born 5 August 1954 in Zürich, Switzerland) is a Swiss cinematographer.

He studied English and art history at the University of Zurich and entered the London Film School. After freelancing as Camera assistant and Documentary Filmmaker in Switzerland, he directed his first feature film "Privileged" in 1981 with Director Michael Hoffman as Camera operator. With the camera in Hoffman's Promised Land.

Then, Steiger moved to Los Angeles and worked with director Roland Emmerich on films such as Godzilla, The Day After Tomorrow, and 10,000 BC.

He is a member of the American Society of Cinematographers since 2000.

Selected filmography

 Frankenweenie (1984)
 Promised Land (1987)
 Some Girls (1988)
 The Hot Spot (1990)
 Soapdish (1991)
 Singles (1992)
 Chasers (1994)
 The Jerky Boys: The Movie (1995)
 Now and Then (1995)
 House Arrest (1996)
 Godzilla (1998)
 Austin Powers: The Spy Who Shagged Me (1999)
 Bowfinger (1999)
 Just Visiting (2001)
 Black Knight (2001)
 Rock Star (2001)
 Stealing Harvard (2002)
 The Day After Tomorrow (2004)
 Nomad (2005)
 10,000 BC (2008)
 The Maiden Heist (2009)
 From Beginning to End (2009)
 Friendship! (2010)
 Nosso Lar (2010)

References

External links 
 
Ueli Steiger - cinematographers.nl

1954 births
Living people
Swiss cinematographers
Film people from Zürich
Alumni of the London Film School
University of Zurich alumni